Buona la prima! is an Italian television series based on the format Schillerstraße.

See also
List of Italian television series

External links
 

Italian television series
2006 Italian television series debuts
2009 Italian television series endings
Italia 1 original programming